Rainy Lake 26A is a First Nations reserve on Rainy Lake in Rainy River District, Ontario. It is the main reserve of the Nigigoonsiminikaaning First Nation.

References

Saulteaux reserves in Ontario
Communities in Rainy River District